Mother Teresa: No Greater Love is an American documentary film about the life of Mother Teresa which stars Brian Kolodiejchuk, Ridoyanul Hoq, Patrick Kelly, Konrad Krajewski, Bishop Robert Barron, Cardinal Konrad Krajewski, Sister Mary Bernice and George Weigel. The film directed, written and produced by David Naglieri and it was released in a limited number of theaters across the United States on October 3 and 4, 2022.

Plot 
The film reveals unusual access to institutional archives and features Missionaries of Charity missionaries and how her vision to serve Christ among the poor is being implemented today through the Missionaries of Charity.

Cast 

 Brian Kolodiejchuk
 Patrick Kelly
 Sister Mary Bernice
 George Weigel
 Ridoaynul Hoq
 Jim Wahlberg
 Sister Prema
 Bishop Robert Barron
 Cardinal Konrad Krajewski

References

External links 

 

2022 films
2022 documentary films
American documentary films
2020s American films